Odee Township is a township in Meade County, Kansas, in the United States.

History
Odee was named for O. D. Lemert, who was instrumental in securing a post office.

References

Townships in Meade County, Kansas
Townships in Kansas